Quaver's Marvelous World of Music, commonly referred to on site as Quaver, Quaver Music, and Quaver's World is an educational music web site. It is used as a music curriculum in schools around the United States.

Overview
The site was founded by David V. Mastran and Graham Hepburn. The site offers teaching tools for children about basic music knowledge.

References

External links
Official site

American educational websites
American music websites